Television in Armenia was introduced in 1955, when Armenia was still known as the Armenian SSR.

List of channels
This is a list of television channels that broadcast from Armenia in Armenian.

Public

Private

Regional

Discontinued

Internet TV

See also 
Armenian soap operas
Media of Armenia